Lex Richardson (born 16 November 1958) is a Scottish former professional football player and manager. Richardson was active as a midfielder between 1976 and 1991, making 455 appearances in the Scottish Football League, before becoming a junior manager.

Career
Born in Glasgow, Richardson began his career with Arthurlie, before turning professional in 1976 with St Mirren. He later played for Dundee, Greenock Morton, Arbroath and Albion Rovers, before retiring in 1991 to become manager of Carnoustie Panmure.

References

Sources
 

1958 births
Living people
Scottish footballers
Scottish football managers
Arthurlie F.C. players
St Mirren F.C. players
Dundee F.C. players
Greenock Morton F.C. players
Arbroath F.C. players
Albion Rovers F.C. players
Scottish Football League players
Carnoustie Panmure F.C. managers
Footballers from Glasgow
Association football midfielders
Scottish Football League representative players
Scotland under-21 international footballers
Scottish Junior Football Association players